Yan Valerievich Golubovsky (born March 9, 1976) is a Russian former professional ice hockey player.

Draft
He was drafted 1st (23rd overall) by the Detroit Red Wings in the 1994 NHL Entry Draft.

Playing career
In early 1993, Golubovsky played as a defenceman for Dynamo Moscow's second team and was noticed early on. He made the jump later that season to the touring Russian Penguins of the IHL and was drafted by the Detroit Red Wings in 1994. He spent three full years in the AHL with the Adirondack Red Wings before finally being called up to play for the Detroit Red Wings in 1997. However, his NHL debut was short-lived as he did not develop as much as the team hoped, causing Golubovsky to split his time between the AHL and NHL. The following three seasons saw the same for Yan, being called up to the NHL, only to be sent back down after a handful of games.

On December 28, 2000 he was traded to the Florida Panthers for center Igor Larionov, but continued to split time between the NHL and AHL within the Panthers organization.

In 2001 Golubovsky signed with Magnitogorsk Metallurg of the RSL and spent the next four years being shuttled between teams. After stints with CSKA Moscow, Cherepovets Severstal, and SKA Saint Petersburg, he signed a contract to play for Leksands IF of the Swedish Elite League for the 05–06 season.

Post-playing career
On 22 June 2021, he was officially deemed a fugitive from justice after missing a court date. He was charged with misappropriation of 17 million rubles (approximately 200,000 euros) while working as a general director of Torpedo Nizhny Novgorod.

Career statistics

References

External links

1976 births
Adirondack Red Wings players
Cincinnati Mighty Ducks players
Detroit Red Wings draft picks
Detroit Red Wings players
Florida Panthers players
HC CSKA Moscow players
HC Morzine-Avoriaz players
HC Ryazan players
HC Sibir Novosibirsk players
HK Acroni Jesenice players
Leksands IF players
Living people
Louisville Panthers players
Metallurg Magnitogorsk players
National Hockey League first-round draft picks
Sportspeople from Novosibirsk
Russian ice hockey defencemen
Russian Penguins players
Severstal Cherepovets players
SKA Saint Petersburg players
Yunost Minsk players